The former United States Post Office and Federal Building is a historic structure in downtown Zanesville, Ohio, United States.  Built in 1904, it was designed by Cleveland architect George F. Hammond.  The post office and courthouse was listed on the National Register of Historic Places in 1988.

References

Federal buildings in the United States
Government buildings completed in 1904
Beaux-Arts architecture in Ohio
Courthouses in Ohio
Zanesville
Buildings and structures in Zanesville, Ohio
Zanesville
National Register of Historic Places in Muskingum County, Ohio